Stang's law is a Proto-Indo-European (PIE) phonological rule named after the Norwegian linguist Christian Stang.

Overview
The law governs the word-final sequences of a vowel, followed by a semivowel ( or ) or a laryngeal ( or ), followed by a nasal. According to the law these sequences are simplified such that laryngeals and semivowels are dropped, with compensatory lengthening of a preceding vowel.

Often the rules  and also  are added:

 PIE  'sky' (accusative singular) >  > Sanskrit dyā́m, acc. sg. of dyaús, Latin diem (which served as the basis for Latin diēs 'day'), Greek Ζῆν (Zên) (reformed after Homeric Greek to Ζῆνα Zêna, subsequently Δία Día), acc. of Ζεύς (Zeús)
 PIE  'cow' (acc. sg.) >  > Sanskrit gā́m, acc. sg. of gaús, Greek (Homeric and dialectal) βών (bṓn), acc. sg. of βοῦς (boûs) 'cow'
 acc. sg. of PIE  'grain' after laryngeal colouring is the disyllabic , not trisyllabic

See also
 Szemerényi's law

References

Sound laws
Proto-Indo-European language